Summerfields Wood is a   Local Nature Reserve in Hastings in East Sussex. It is owned and managed by Hastings Borough Council.

There are many paths through this semi-natural wood, which has a number of ponds. Birds include firecrest, whinchat, ring ouzel, wood warbler, spotted flycatcher and pied flycatcher.

References

Local Nature Reserves in East Sussex